Vijay Maurya is an Indian actor, writer and director who works in Hindi films and theatre. He is best known for his work in the 2019 Hindi musical film Gully Boy.

Early life
Maurya was born and raised in Mumbai, Maharashtra.

Career

Theatre
Maurya began his career in theatre by enrolling in a workshop under Satyadev Dubey for acting. He was an integral part of Prithvi Theatre from 1993 to 2008. He has worked in 14 original plays which have had a total of over 2500 shows. Some of his plays include Meena Kumari, Airawat, Solah Saal Ka Aakash, Jungle Ke Paar, Laila, Sa Hi Besura. The play Sa Hi Besura has been his most popular running successfully with over a 100 shows.

He has worked with Makrand Deshpande, Sudhir Pandey, Kay Kay Menon, Sanjna Kapoor among others in Indian theatre.

Films
Maurya has acted in critically acclaimed films like Nishikant Kamat's Mumbai Meri Jaan and Anurag Kashyap's Black Friday. He is also a screenwriter and has won a National Film Award for Best Screenplay for the film Chillar Party along with Nitesh Tiwari and Vikas Bahl at the 59th National Film Awards. His latest film Gully Boy as a dialogue writer and supporting actor has been well received both critically and commercially.

Maurya made his digital debut as a director with the Amazon Original series Crash Course, created, produced and written by former UTV Motion Pictures associate Manish Hariprasad and co-written by Raina Roy.

Commercials
Having directed over a 150 commercials, Maurya is known for his witty sense of humour and has directed commercials for a number of Indian and International brands. He continues to work as an ad-film director along with his film commitments.

Filmography

Awards

Filmfare Awards

IIFA Awards

References

External links

1971 births
Living people
Best Original Screenplay National Film Award winners